Ahmed Mohammed (with some minor variations of spelling transliteration) is an Arabic patronymic name. It means Ahmed, Son of Mohammed (more precisely expressed as Ahmed bin Mohammed) or Ahmed, descendant of Mohammed.

Given name
Given the popularity of Ahmed and Mohammed as given name, there are many "Ahmed, son of Mohammed":

Ahmed Mohammed al-Maqqari (c. 1578–1632), Arab-Algerian historian
Ahmed bin Mohammed al-Khalili (born 1942), Grand Mufti of the Sultanate of Oman
Ahmed Mohamed (general) (born 1964), Vice Chief of Defence Force of the Maldives National Defence Force
Ahmed Mohammed Hamed Ali (1965–2010), Egyptian citizen suspected of terrorism
Ahmed Mohamed (born c. 2001), student arrested after bringing a reassembled clock to school in the Ahmed Mohamed clock incident

Politics
Ahmed Mohammed Ali Al-Madani (born 1934), Saudi politician
Ahmed Mohamed ag Hamani (born 1942), Prime Minister of Mali
Ahmed Mohammed Inuwa (born 1948), Nigerian senator
Ahmed Mohammed Makarfi (born 1956), Nigerian politician
Ahmed Mohammed (Yemeni politician) (born 1960)
Ahmed Mohammed Haroun (born 1964), Sudanese politician wanted internationally for war crimes in civil war

Sports
Ahmad Salam Muhammad (born 1924), Pakistani Olympic sports shooter
Ahmed Mohamed (fencer) (born 1964), Egyptian Olympic fencer
Ahmed Mohamed Ismail (born 1964), Somali Olympic marathon runner
Ahmed Mohamed (field hockey) (born 1981), Egyptian Olympic hockey player
Ahmed Mohamed (weightlifter) (born 1988), Egyption Olympic weightlifter
Ahmed Abid Ali (born Ahmed Mohammed in 1986) Iraqi footballer
Ahmed Mohammed Al Mahri (born 1988), United Arab Emirati footballer
Ahmed Fathi Mohamed (born 1990), Egyptian footballer
Ahmed Mohamed (volleyball) (born 1989), Egyptian volleyball player
Ahmed Mohamed (sport shooter), Egyptian sport shooter
Ahmed Mohamed (basketball) (born 1995), on the Egypt national basketball team
Ahmed Mohamed (handballer) (born 1990), Egyptian handballer

Middle name
When Ahmed Mohammed (or bin Ahmed bin Mohammed) occur after the person's proper name and usually before the family name (clan name), is means the person is son of Ahmed, son of Mohammed, may refer to:
Jamal Ahmad Mohammad Al Badawi (born 1969), Yemeni citizen and suspected with terrorism
Hayat Ahmed Mohammed (born 1982), 2003 Miss World contender from Ethiopia

See also
Muhammad Ahmad (disambiguation)